= Dj AliPink =

Iranian DJ, music producer, and record label founder

AliPink (born Ali D., 1979, Tehran) is an Iranian DJ, music producer, and record label founder. He is regarded as a pioneer of underground electronic music in Iran. His artist name derives from his admiration for Pink Floyd.

== Career ==
AliPink has been active in Tehran's underground electronic music scene for more than two decades. In 2017, he founded Techno Tehran Records, an independent label that has released over 75 tracks and has featured collaborations with more than 60 international artists. In 2021, he launched Techno Tehran Radio as a companion broadcast platform. He has released music on international labels including Steyoyoke, ZEHN Records, and Future Romance.

== Imprisonment ==
Electronic music events are criminalized in Iran. AliPink has faced repeated legal consequences as a result of his activities. In a first arrest, he was detained for two weeks, his equipment was confiscated, and his Instagram account was seized by authorities. He was released on a bail bond of $10,000. He was arrested again in 2023 and spent six months in prison.

== Reception ==
Rolling Stone covered AliPink in the context of its reporting on Iran's 2025–2026 protests, describing his activities as occurring "at the risk of punishment by death." Turbulent Times referred to him independently as "the godfather of techno in Iran" in its coverage of the January 2026 protests. EDM Identity profiled him as "a veteran DJ, producer, and pioneer of the electronic music scene in Tehran." Under the Radar published an in-depth feature on AliPink and the underground music scene in Iran.
